Leandro Gobatto (born April 4, 1982 in São Paulo) is a Brazilian footballer. He currently plays for Santa Cruz Futebol Clube. After being loan for a season to Piacenza Calcio in Italian Serie B, he returned to Costa Rica.Nowadays he plays in Brazil again, playing in the São Bernardo.

External links
 Brazilian FA Database
Nacion profile 

1982 births
Living people
Brazilian footballers
Brazilian expatriate footballers
Serie B players
Clube Atlético Juventus players
Piacenza Calcio 1919 players
Santa Cruz Futebol Clube players
Expatriate footballers in Italy
Footballers from São Paulo
Association football forwards